The lakes of Vens (French: Lacs de Vens) are located in the massif of the Mercantour, between the elevations of  and , in the township of Saint-Étienne-de-Tinée, in the department of the Alpes-Maritimes.

Geography 
The lakes of Vens consist of a succession of five main lakes.

Itinerary 
The lakes of Vens are accessible to the hikers from the hamlet of the Pra on the route of the col de la Bonette or from Saint-Étienne-de-Tinée.

References 

Vens
Vens